Angelique Kerber was the defending champion, but she chose not to participate this year.

Karolína Plíšková won the title, defeating Camila Giorgi in the final, 6–7(4–7), 6–3, 7–6(7–4), despite being a match point down in the third set.

Seeds

Draw

Finals

Top half

Bottom half

Qualifying

Seeds

Qualifiers

Lucky loser 
  Kiki Bertens

Draw

First qualifier

Second qualifier

Third qualifier

Fourth qualifier

References 
 Main draw
 Qualifying draw

Generali Ladies Linz - Singles
Generali Ladies Linz Singles